Cardinal point can refer to:
Cardinal direction, the directions of the compass
Cardinal point (optics), a set of special points in an optical system, which help in the analysis of its properties
Cardinal Points, a student-run newspaper at Plattsburgh State University